Calvary Cemetery is located at 248 Belle Vista Avenue on the west side of Youngstown, Ohio. The cemetery is maintained by the Roman Catholic Diocese of Youngstown. The cemetery is one of the four cemeteries the Diocese oversees in Mahoning, Trumbull, and Stark counties.

The cemetery was established in 1885. Over the next few decades, most of the burials in two cemeteries, The Old Catholic Cemetery known as Rose Hill and The German Catholic Cemetery known as St. Joseph's Church Cemetery, were removed to Calvary Cemetery. This means Calvary has burials of people who died prior to its establishment in 1885.

Notable burials

Actors/Actresses
 Pat Bilon  (1947–19830), actor who played ET in E.T. the Extra-Terrestrial

Political
 Charles J. Carney (1913–1987), US Congressman
 Michael J. Kirwan (1886–1970), US Congressman

Sports
 George "Shotgun" Shuba (1924–2014), MLB with the Brooklyn Dodgers

Military
 Leonard Thom (1924–2014), Executive Officer with John F. Kennedy on PT-109's last mission
 One British Commonwealth war grave, of a Royal Air Force officer of World War II.

Others
 Dr. Louis Rampona (1904–1986), physician to Albert Einstein, Robert Oppenheimer, and George Gallup

References

External links
  – Catholic Funeral & Cemetery Services
 

Cemeteries in Mahoning County, Ohio
Roman Catholic cemeteries in Ohio
Protected areas of Mahoning County, Ohio
Buildings and structures in Youngstown, Ohio
Tourist attractions in Youngstown, Ohio